Thomas Adderley  was an Irish politician.

Adderley was educated at Trinity College, Dublin. From 1752 to 1761, he was MP for Charlemont in County Armagh.

He was notable for being the step-father of James Caulfeild, 1st Earl of Charlemont.

References

Alumni of Trinity College Dublin
Irish MPs 1727–1760
Members of the Parliament of Ireland (pre-1801) for County Armagh constituencies